"With a Woman You Love" is a song by American country music singer Justin Moore. It was released in October 2021 as the lead single to Moore's upcoming seventh studio album Stray Dog. Moore co-wrote the song with Paul DiGiovanni, Chase McGill and Jeremy Stover, the latter of whom co-produced the song.

Content
The song has a romantic theme, described by the blog Whiskey Riff as a tribute to Moore's wife, Kate. Moore told The Boot that the idea came to him when he was driving through Florida, and that he considered the song to have a similar sound to country music from the early 1990s.

Charts

Weekly charts

Year-end charts

References

2022 singles
2022 songs
Justin Moore songs
Songs written by Chase McGill
Songs written by Justin Moore
Songs written by Jeremy Stover
Song recordings produced by Jeremy Stover
Big Machine Records singles